Alqchin-e Olya (also Romanized as Alqchīn-e ‘Olyā; also known as Alqchīn-e Bālā, Alqechīn-e Bālā, and Elqechīn Bālā) is a village in Alqchin Rural District, in the Central District of Charam County, Kohgiluyeh and Boyer-Ahmad Province, Iran. At the 2006 census, its population was 1,006, in 183 families.

References 

Populated places in Charam County